Ion Oblemenco Stadium was a multi-purpose stadium in Craiova, Romania. It was used mostly for football matches and was the home ground of Universitatea Craiova. The stadium used to hold up to 25,252 people before it was demolished.

The stadium was entirely demolished and was replaced by an all-seater that was opened in November 2017.

History
The stadium was opened on 29 October 1967 with national teams of Romania and Poland scoring 2 goals each and was originally named Central Stadium. It hosted many memorable matches during the Craiova Maxima era such as the 1981–82 European Cup Quarterfinal against Bayern Munich and the 1982–83 UEFA Cup Semifinal against Benfica.

Following the death of Universitatea Craiova legend Ion Oblemenco in 1996, the stadium was renamed in his honour. In 2008, the stadium underwent a major renovation.

Romania national football team
The following national team matches were held in the stadium:

References

Gallery

See also
List of football stadiums in Romania.

Buildings and structures in Craiova
Football venues in Romania
Multi-purpose stadiums in Romania
Defunct football venues in Romania
Sport in Craiova
CS Universitatea Craiova
FC U Craiova 1948